Sodium methylparaben (sodium methyl para-hydroxybenzoate) is a compound with formula Na(CH3(C6H4COO)O). It is the sodium salt of methylparaben.

It is a food additive with the E number E219 which is used as a preservative.

References

Benzoate esters
Organic sodium salts
Food additives
Methyl esters
E-number additives
Phenolates